Jisk'a Kunturiri (Aymara jisk'a little, kunturi condor, -ri a suffix, Kunturiri the name of a neighboring mountain, "little Kunturiri", Hispanicized spelling Jiskha Condoriri) is a mountain in the Andes of Bolivia which rises up to . It is situated in the Oruro Department, Sajama Province, Curahuara de Carangas Municipality, Sajama Canton, north-west of the extinct Sajama volcano.  Kunturi lies south-west of the mountains Jach'a Kunturiri ("big Kunturiri") and Pumuta, north-east of Patilla Pata and the small lake named Ch'iyar Quta and east of the mountain Kunturiri.

The Kunturiri River originates east of the mountain. It flows to the south and then to the east as a tributary of the Sajama River.

See also
 Sajama National Park
List of mountains in the Andes

References 

Mountains of Oruro Department